Tazovsky District (Nenets: Тасу’ Яваʼʼ, Tasuꜧ Javaꜧ) is an administrative and municipal district (raion), one of the seven in Yamalo-Nenets Autonomous Okrug of Tyumen Oblast, Russia. It is located in the north, northeast, and east of the autonomous okrug and borders Purovsky, Nadymsky, and Krasnoselkupsky District; these exist to the south, south-west, and south-east, respectively - alongside Yamalsky District west over Gulf of Ob, and Taymyrsky Dolgano-Nenetsky District and Turukhansky District east within Krasnoyarsk Krai. Its administrative center is the rural locality (a settlement) of Tazovsky. Population: 16,537 (2010 Census);  The population of the administrative center accounts for 41.1% of the district's total population.

Demographics
Ethnic composition (2010):
 Nenets – 54.2%
 Russians – 30.5%
 Ukrainians – 4.8%
 Tatars – 3.1%
 Nogais – 1%
 Azerbaijanis – 1%
 Others – 5.4%

See also
Nakhodka

References

Notes

Sources

Districts of Yamalo-Nenets Autonomous Okrug